Cisseps packardii is a moth of the subfamily Arctiinae. It was described by Augustus Radcliffe Grote in 1865. It is found in North America from California to Manitoba.

The North American Moth Photographer's Group and BugGuide have this name as a synonym of Cisseps fulvicollis, but it is listed as a species by Lepidoptera and Some Other Life Forms.

References

Ctenuchina
Moths described in 1865